Wai Assembly constituency is an assembly constituency of the Maharashtra Legislative Assembly in Satara district, Maharashtra, India.

It is a part of the Satara (Lok Sabha constituency), along with five other assembly constituencies, viz Patan, Karad South, Koregaon, Satara and Karad North from the Satara district.

Members of Legislative Assembly
Key

Election results

Assembly elections 2014

See also

 List of constituencies of Maharashtra Legislative Assembly
 Wai

References

Assembly constituencies of Maharashtra
Satara district